Ozias most commonly refers to Uzziah, the king of the ancient Kingdom of Judah.

Ozias may also refer to:

People 
 Ozias Bowen (1805–1871), former Justice of the Ohio Supreme Court
 Ozias Bvute, Zimbabwe cricket administrator
 Ozias Goodwin, co-founder of Hartford, Connecticut
 Ozias M. Hatch (1814–1893), former Illinois Secretary of State
 Ozias Humphrey (1742–1810), English painter
 Ozias Leduc (1864–1955), Canadian painter
 Ozias Thurston Linley (1765–1831), British musician
 Ozias Johnson (1910–1980)

Other uses 
 Ozias, Greece, a community in the Paxi island group